Michael David Kull (born 20 August 1981), better known as Mike Candys, is a Swiss record producer and DJ. He is managed by Mevlan D.

Musical career
In 2008, Candys became widely known in Switzerland with the song "La Serenissima". In 2009 he again found success after collaborating with Jack Holiday on a remix of the Faithless song "Insomnia", which reached the top 10 in various European singles charts. His third single, "People Hold On", ranked fourth in the 2010 European club charts and was followed by "Together Again", which helped him to become internationally recognized. In 2011, he reached the top of the charts with "One Night in Ibiza", a track that contains elements of 1990s eurodance, featuring female vocalist Evelyn Zangger and rapper Patrick Miller. The song was an answer to "Welcome to St. Tropez" by Swiss DJ Antoine and Timati. In March 2012, Mike Candys released "2012 (If The World Would End)" that became a top 10 hit in German speaking countries. It is his most successful single so far.

Discography

Albums

Singles

References

External links 
 

1971 births
Swiss house musicians
Swiss DJs
Living people
Masked musicians
Electronic dance music DJs